Tal Bar on (Hebrew: טל בראון‎; born August 7, 1992 in Tel Aviv) is an Israeli chess Grandmaster.

Life 
Baron was born in Tel Aviv and grew up in Herzliya, where he also attended high school. He acquired the title of International Master in 2010, having completed the required norms in December 2008 at the Israeli championship in Haifa and in 2010 at the European championship in Rijeka. He was awarded the title of Grandmaster in 2011.

In April 2017, Baron confessed to using a chess computer to cheat, as a technical matter, in the final round of an online tournament on Chess.com.

He won the gold medal in the second GM group at the 2017 Maccabiah Games, in which former Women's World Champion, Ukrainian grandmaster Anna Ushenina took the silver medal.

In 2019, he won 2nd- 3rd place in the Netanya International Chess Championship along with Alexander Moiseenko.

References

External links

Tal Baron chess games at 365Chess.com

1972 births
Living people
Chess grandmasters
Israeli chess players
Competitors at the 2017 Maccabiah Games
Maccabiah Games medalists in chess
Maccabiah Games gold medalists for Israel